Hero cults were one of the most distinctive features of ancient Greek religion. In Homeric Greek, "hero" refers to the mortal offspring of a human and a god. By the historical period, however, the word came to mean specifically a dead man, venerated and propitiated at his tomb or at a designated shrine, because his fame during life or his unusual manner of death gave him power to support and protect the living. A hero was more than human but less than a god, and  various kinds of supernatural figures came to be assimilated to the class of heroes; the distinction between a hero and a god was less than certain, especially in the case of Heracles, the most prominent, but atypical hero.

The grand ruins and tumuli (large burial mounds) remaining from the Bronze Age gave the pre-literate Greeks of the 10th and 9th centuries BC a sense of a once grand and now vanished age; they reflected this in the oral epic tradition, which would become famous by way of works such as the Iliad and the Odyssey. Copious renewed offerings begin to be represented, after a hiatus, at sites like Lefkandi, even though the names of the grandly buried dead were hardly remembered. "Stories began to be told to individuate the persons who were now believed to be buried in these old and imposing sites", observes Robin Lane Fox. In other words, this is a clear cut example of an origin story for Heroes and what they meant to the Ancient Greeks.

Nature of hero cult
Greek hero-cults were distinct from the clan-based ancestor worship from which they developed, in that as the polis evolved, they became a civic rather than familial affair, and in many cases none of the worshipers traced their descent back to the hero any longer: no shrine to a hero can be traced unbroken from Mycenaean times. Whereas the ancestor was purely local, Lewis Farnell observed, the hero might be tended in more than one locality, and he deduced that hero-cult was more deeply influenced from the epic tradition, that "suggested many a name to forgotten graves", and provided even Dorians a connection to Mycenaean heroes, according to Coldstream.  "Coldstream believed the currency of epic would account for votives in Dorian areas, where an alien, immigrant population might otherwise be expected to show no particular reverence for Mycenaean predecessors". Large Mycenaean tholos tombs that betokened a grander past, were often the site of hero-cults. Not all heroes were even known by names.
 

Aside from the epic tradition, which featured the heroes alive and in action rather than as objects of cultus, the earliest written reference to hero-cult is attributed to Dracon, the Athenian lawgiver of the late seventh century BC, who prescribed that gods and local heroes should both be honoured according to ancestral custom. The custom, then, was already established, and there were multiple local heroes. The written sources emphasise the importance of heroes' tombs and the temenos or sanctuary, where chthonic rites appeased their spirits and induced them to continue to favour the people who looked to them as founders, of whom founding myths were related. In the hero's restricted and local scope he "retained the limited and partisan interests of his mortal life. He would help those who lived in the vicinity of his tomb or who belonged to the tribe of which he himself was the founder," observes Robert Parker, with the reservation that Heracles, with his pan-Hellenic scope, was again the exception.

Whitley interpreted the final stage, in which hero-cult was co-opted by the city-state as a political gesture, in the archaic aristocratic tumulus surrounded by stelae, erected by Athens to the cremated citizen-heroes of Marathon (490 BC), to whom chthonic cult was dedicated, as the offering trenches indicate. 
On the other hand, Greek heroes were distinct  from the Roman cult of dead emperors, because the hero was not thought of as having ascended to Olympus or become a god: he was beneath the earth, and his power purely local. For this reason hero cults were chthonic in nature, and their rituals more closely resembled those for Hecate and Persephone than those for Zeus and Apollo: libations in the dark hours, sacrifices that were not shared by the living.

Two exceptions to the above were Heracles and Asclepius, who might be honored as either heroes or gods, with chthonic libation or with burnt sacrifice. Heroes in cult behaved very differently from heroes in myth. They might appear indifferently as men or as snakes, and they seldom appeared unless angered. A Pythagorean saying advises not to eat food that has fallen on the floor, because "it belongs to the heroes". Heroes if ignored or left unappeased could turn malicious: in a fragmentary play by Aristophanes, a chorus of anonymous heroes describe themselves as senders of lice, fever and boils.

Some of the earliest hero and heroine cults well attested by archaeological evidence in mainland Greece include the Menelaion dedicated to Menelaus and Helen at Therapne near Sparta, a shrine at Mycenae dedicated to Agamemnon and Cassandra, another at Amyklai dedicated to Alexandra, and another in Ithaca's Polis Bay dedicated to Odysseus. These all seem to date to the 8th century BC. The cult of Pelops at Olympia dates from the Archaic period.

Heroes (Male) and Heroines (Female)
Hero cults were offered most prominently to men, though in practice the experience of the votary was of propitiating a cluster of family figures, which included women who were wives of a hero-husband, mothers of a hero-son (Alcmene and Semele), and daughters of a hero-father. As Finley observed of the world of Odysseus, which he reads as a nostalgic eighth-century rendering of traditions from the culture of Dark Age Greece,
Penelope became a moral heroine for later generations, the embodiment of goodness and chastity, to be contrasted with the faithless, murdering Clytaemnestra, Agamemnon's wife; but 'hero' has no feminine gender in the age of heroes.

Where local cult venerated figures such as the sacrificial virgin  Iphigeneia, an archaic local nymphe has been reduced to a mortal figure of legend. Other isolated female figures represented priestess-initiators of a local cult. Iconographic and epigraphal evidence marshalled by Larson combine to depict heroines as similar in kind to heroes, but in androcentric Greek culture, typically of lesser stature. This is consistent with the role that women played in not only Ancient Greece, but the ancient world as a whole — more in the shadows and service-oriented than focused on personal development and relaxation.

Types of hero cult

Whitley distinguishes four or five essential types of hero cult:

 Oikist cults of founders. Such cults arose in colonies in the Hellenic world in Magna Graecia and Sicily at the grave of the founder, the oikist. In the case of cults at the tombs of the recently heroised, it must be assumed that the identity of the occupant of the tomb was unequivocally known. Thucydides (V.11.1) gives the example of Brasidas at Amphipolis. Battus of Cyrene might also be mentioned. "Such historical examples," Whitley warns, "have clearly colored the interpretation of certain tomb cults in the Archaic period." Such Archaic sites as the heroön at Lefkandi and that close to the West Gate at Eretria cannot be distinguished by archaeological methods from family observances at tombs (tomb cults) and the cult of ancestors.
 Cults to named heroes. A number of cult sites known in Classical times were dedicated to known heroes in the Greek and modern senses, especially of the Iliad and other episodes of the Epic Cycle. Whitley makes two points here, first that the earliest heria associate the male hero with earlier and stronger female presences, and second, that figures such as Odysseus, Agamemnon and Menelaus all have strong local connections. The cults of Oedipus at Athens and Pelops at Olympia are examples.
 Cults to local heroes. Such local figures do not figure among the Panhellenic figures of epic. Examples would be Akademos and Erechtheus at Athens.
 Cults at Bronze Age tombs. These are represented archaeologically by Iron Age deposits in Mycenaean tombs, not easily interpreted. Because of the gap in time between the Bronze Age collapse and the earliest votive objects, continuity appears to be broken. A sherd from above the Grave Circle A at Mycenae is simply inscribed "to the hero", and Whitley suggests that the unnamed race of the Silver Age might have been invoked. In Attica, such cults are those associated with tholos tombs at Thorikos and Menidhi.
 Oracular hero cults. Whitley does not address this group of local cults where an oracle developed, as in the case of Amphiaraus, who was swallowed up by a gaping crack in the earth. Minor cults accrued to some figures who died violent or unusual deaths, as in the case of the dead from the Battle of Marathon, and those struck by lightning, as in several attested cases in Magna Graecia.

Tombs and tumuli 
All across Greece and sometimes into Turkey lay burial mounds. Sometimes on ancient battlefields or just in a frequently visited common area lay giant mounds of earth. Scholars call these mounds "tumulus". Many wondered why people built these mounds and what greater purpose they served. One notable example is following the Battle of Marathon in 490 BC. The Athenians, having defeated the Persians, needed to bury their dead. 192 dead in total, they were buried on the same field on which they had died and under a giant mound. This particular mound became what is known as the Marathon Tumuli. These mounds began popping up all over Greece as a gesture of respect to the dead, and as many scholars believe, it was also a way to connect them with the earth.

Most commonly in Ancient Greece, these mounds could have had any 1 of 3 main components, composed in a staircase-like format, within the mound. This staircase like structure may have 1 or 2 steps that would help carry out various ceremonial functions as well as serve as storing places for valuable items. The first step would be used for cremation and the ashes piled in after that while the second step would hold any votives or items of sentimental value. Then the whole thing would be covered by a giant mound. In the case of the Athenian monument they also surrounded it with tall, skinny stone slabs that may read an honoring message or be dedicated to any one ‘hero'.

Heroes, politics, and gods
Much of the scholarship that has been done surrounding Heroes, Gods, and the Politics that plays a role in much of what we know about them today has all come from either written accounts or archeological findings. In fact, in many cases both types of evidence may contradict each other. Written evidence can be biased or incomplete, and archeological findings do not always tell us a definitive story. However, hero cults may be a case where they collide positively. First, despite the numerous written accounts of these heroes, hero shrines are few in number and peculiar in pattern. This is proof that the cults were widespread on Greece, with multiple cities having their own iterations of each Hero to fit their own needs.

Another way in which the Cults were used was for political propaganda and manipulation. Sparta's propping up of many hero cults was out of recognition of the fact that their population reacted to them in such a way that would allow them to use the hero shrines as political propaganda. For example, Lewis Farnell believed that, because of the fact hero cults are often not found in a hero's home territory, there is a greater chance that the cults were widespread and common among most Greeks. Whereas other cults may be ancestral dating back to even the 8th century.

Only Laconia has evidence of assigning its shrines to specific heroes meaning that the rest of the shrines were not to any one specific hero but allowed for worship to a hero via one shrine. Unlike the Roman beliefs it was thought that the Heroes did not ascend to the skies and be with the gods of Olympus, but rather they would go down into and become one with the earth. This impacted not only how the Greeks treated the Heroes, but thought about them in a political sense. They were respected and worshiped, but could even at times turn vicious if ignored and be the supposed cause of diseases or mishaps.

Hero cults could also be of the utmost political importance beyond propaganda too. When Cleisthenes divided the Athenians into new demes for voting, he consulted Delphi on what heroes he should name each division after. According to Herodotus, the Spartans attributed their conquest of Arcadia to their theft of the bones of Orestes from the Arcadian town of Tegea. Heroes in myth often had close but conflicted relationships with the gods. Thus, Heracles's name means "the glory of Hera", even though he was tormented all his life by the queen of the gods. This was even truer in their cult appearances.  Perhaps the most striking example is the Athenian king Erechtheus, whom Poseidon killed for choosing Athena over him as the city's patron god. When the Athenians worshiped Erechtheus on the Acropolis, they invoked him as Poseidon Erechtheus.

List of heroes

Achlae – Greek river god, Achelous
Achle, Achile – Legendary hero of the Trojan War, from the Greek Achilles
Achilles at Leuce
Actaeon pupil of the centaur Chiron
Aeneas
Ajax
Akademos
Alexander the Great at Alexandria
Amphiaraus
Atalanta
Asclepius
Battus at Cyrene
Bellerophon
Bouzyges
Cadmus – the Phoenician founder of Thebes
Cyamites – of the Eleusinian mysteries who presided over the cultivation of Fava beans.
 Diomedes
Erechtheus  at Athens
Hector
Hephaestion
Heracles
Homer, venerated at Alexandria by Ptolemy IV Philopator
Jason
Leonidas
Lycurgus
Meleager
Odysseus
Oedipus at Athens
Orion at Boeotia
Orpheus
Pandora the first woman, whose curiosity brought evil to mankind
Penthesilea
Peleus – he fathered the famous hero Achilles.
Pelops at Olympia
Perseus
Philippus of Croton
Theseus
Tantalus
Paris

See also
Demigod
Culture hero
Epic poetry
Imperial cult of ancient Rome
Kami
Bodhisattva
Dharmapala
Deification
Shen (Chinese religion)
Thracian religion
Relics in classical antiquity
Chinese hero cult

Notes

References
Carla Antonaccio, An Archaeology of Ancestors: Tomb and Hero Cult in Ancient Greece, 1994
Lewis R. Farnell, Greek Hero-Cults and Ideas of Immortality (Oxford), 1921.
E. Kearns, The Heroes of Attica (BICS supplement 57) London, 1989.
Karl Kerenyi, The Heroes of the Greeks, 1959
Gregory Nagy, The Best of the Achaeans: Concepts of the Hero in Archaic Greek Poetry, 1979.
Erwin Rohde, Psyche: The Cult of Souls and Belief in Immortality among the Greeks, 1925
Jennifer Larson, Greek Heroine Cults (1995)
Jennifer Larson, Ancient Greek Cults: A Guide (2007). Routledge. 
D. Lyons, Gender and Immortality: Heroines in Ancient Greek Myth and Cult (1996)
D. Boehringer, Heroenkulte in Griechenland von der geometrischen bis zur klassischen Zeit: Attika, Argolis, Messenien (2001)
G. Ekroth, The Sacrificial Rituals of Greek Hero-Cults (2002)
B. Currie, Pindar and the Cult of Heroes'' (2005)

 
Greek mythology
Ancient Greek religion
Hellenistic philosophy and religion

de:Heros